Moritz Ferdinand Freiherr von Bissing (30 January 1844 – 18 April 1917) was a German officer from Prussia.

Life and pre-WWI army career

Bissing was born at Ober Bellmannsdorf in the Province of Silesia. He was the son of Moritz von Bissing, a member of the landed gentry who was known to speak his mind to the Kaiser. In 1865 Bissing entered the Prussian Army as a lieutenant in the cavalry, and he soon saw active service in the Austro-Prussian War and the Franco-Prussian War. Gaining steady promotion, in 1887 the young Major was appointed as an aide-de-camp to the crown prince, who later became the Emperor Wilhelm II. He served in the guards cavalry until 1897, when he was given command of the 29th Infantry Division. From 1901 to 1907 Bissing commanded the VII Army Corps in Münster. In 1902 he was promoted to General of the Cavalry, and he retired from the army in 1908.

First World War
Upon the outbreak of the First World War, Bissing was recalled to active duty as deputy commander of the VII Army Corps, serving in that post from August until November 1914. After the fall of Belgium during the early months of the War, Bissing was promoted to Generaloberst and appointed as Governor-General of occupied Belgium, serving from December 1914 until a few days before his death in 1917.

As governor-general, Bissing executed the German Flamenpolitik, during which he netherlandized the Ghent University to make it the first solely Dutch-speaking university in Belgium. As the German Chancellor Theobald von Bethmann Hollweg encouraged Flemish nationalist leaders to declare independence and to integrate into the German sphere, Bissing convened a commission to organise the division of Belgium, issuing a decree on 21 March 1917 which separated Belgium into two administrative areas, Flanders and Wallonia. This was the first attempt at dividing Belgium along linguistic lines.

Taking into account the decision by Walloon nationalists in 1912 to recognize Namur as the central city of Wallonia, Bissing established the Walloon administration there. Wallonia then consisted of four southern Belgian provinces and the district of Nivelles, part of the province of Brabant, thus realizing another revendication of the Walloon movement, the creation of a Walloon Brabant. The Flemish region had Brussels as its capital and was made up of the four northern provinces of Belgium, as well as the districts of Brussels and Leuven.

Among many others, Bissing signed the warrant for the execution of Edith Cavell.

In April 1917 a chronic lung ailment forced Bissing to resign his post as Governor-General, and he succumbed to his illness a few days later, dying near Brussels on 18 April. He is buried at the Invalidenfriedhof in Berlin.

Honours

See also
 Von Bissing university

Notes

References

 Larry Zuckerman, The Rape of Belgium: The Untold Story of World War I, New York University Press, 2004, .

External links
 
 Bissing, Moritz Ferdinand Freiherr von at 1914-1918 Online Encyclopedia.
 

1844 births
1917 deaths
19th-century German people
Cavalry commanders
Barons of Germany
German Army generals of World War I
Colonel generals of Prussia
Members of the Prussian House of Lords
Prussian nobility
People from the Province of Silesia
Burials at the Invalids' Cemetery
Recipients of the Iron Cross (1870), 2nd class
Commanders First Class of the Order of the Dannebrog
Knights Grand Cross of the Order of Saints Maurice and Lazarus
Recipients of the Order of the Crown (Italy)
Grand Officers of the Order of Orange-Nassau
Commanders of the Order of Franz Joseph
German occupation of Belgium during World War I
19th-century Prussian military personnel
Recipients of the Order of the Medjidie, 1st class
Commanders of the Order of the Sword
Grand Officers of the Order of the Star of Romania
Grand Officers of the Order of the Crown (Romania)